Peasiella roepstorffiana is a species of sea snail, a marine gastropod mollusk in the family Littorinidae, the winkles or periwinkles.

Description

Distribution

References

 Subba Rao, N. V. & Dey, A. 2000. Catalogue of Marine Molluscs of Andaman and Nicobar Islands. Zoological Survey of India, Calcutta, Occasional Paper 187: 199–294

Littorinidae
Gastropods described in 1885